The Indiana State Fair stage collapse was an incident during an August 13, 2011, outdoor concert by Sugarland as part of their Incredible  Machine Tour at the Indiana State Fair in which a wind gust from an approaching severe thunderstorm hit the stage's temporary roof structure, causing it to collapse. The structure landed among a crowd of spectators, killing seven people and injuring 58 others.

The members of Sugarland were in a tour bus preparing to come on stage when the collapse occurred at 8:46 p.m. Opening act Sara Bareilles had completed her performance prior to the incident.

Events leading up to the collapse

Discussions about delaying the show
Throughout the day and evening of the concert, the National Weather Service issued notices and warnings predicting strong thunderstorms. Messages about the forecasts were relayed to various State Fair personnel via an automated text-messaging system.

At 8:00 p.m., Cindy Hoye, Executive Director for the Indiana State Fair Commission, held a meeting to discuss what effect the weather forecast would have on the 8:45 p.m. start time for the Sugarland show. Members of the meeting were told that the storm was forecast to arrive at 9:15 p.m., 30 minutes after the concert was to begin. Hoye wanted to delay the show until the weather had passed.

An official took this message to Sugarland's managers, who said they preferred to go on with the show as scheduled and only stop if weather conditions worsened. The managers only knew about the rain, not the lightning, wind, and hail that were expected. They decided to start the show just 5 minutes late (8:50 p.m.) to allow the band time to warm up.

When the band's decision got back to Director Hoye, she accepted, assuming the band had the final say. Since the storm was to arrive at around 9:15 p.m., there would still be time for them to perform some of the show.

Evacuation announcement and concert cancellation 

At around 8:30 p.m., Director Hoye encountered State Police Captain Brad Weaver. Weaver was concerned that the approaching weather would pose a threat to public safety, and recommended that Hoye cancel the show. He also recommended they put together an evacuation plan for the crowd. Hoye directed her staff to make preparations for an evacuation.

This warning was not communicated to Executive Director Hoye or Captain Weaver, who were still anticipating the storm arriving at 9:15 p.m.

At 8:40 p.m., Director Hoye dictated a message to an announcer, who delivered it to the audience at 8:45 p.m. The announcer stated that a storm was approaching but that the show would go on. He gave instructions on how to evacuate to the buildings nearby in case conditions got worse, but there was no directive to actually proceed with an evacuation.

Collapse
After hearing an announcement that the show was going to continue, Captain Weaver confronted Director Hoye and reiterated that the show should be called off. The two agreed, and began walking to the stage to make a second announcement. However, at 8:46 p.m., a wind gust hit the stage structure. Just when it hit, the stage collapsed—before they were able to announce the evacuation.

Tammy Vandam, 42; Glenn Goodrich, 49; Alina BigJohny, 23; and Christina Santiago, 29, all died at the scene. Stagehand Nathan Byrd, age 51; Jennifer Haskell, 22; and Meagan Toothman, 24, later died in the hospital from their injuries.

Investigation
The Indiana State Fair Commission hired the engineering firm Thornton Tomasetti to lead the technical investigation into why the stage collapsed.  The same firm investigated the collapse of the World Trade Center on 9/11 and also investigated the Interstate 35W bridge collapse in Minneapolis.

In addition, the public safety and crisis management firm Witt Associates was hired to investigate the State Fair's preparedness and response to the incident. James Lee Witt, the company's CEO, was the director of the Federal Emergency Management Agency (FEMA) for the Clinton Administration.

Cause of the collapse

According to the final incident report released by Thornton Tomasetti:

Just before the collapse, wind loading caused several of the barriers to slide or pivot from their original positions, allowing the top of the truss structure to lean toward the crowd. The subsequent bending forces within the support columns were too large, and the structure collapsed under its own weight.

Multiple components within the lateral load resisting system were found to be insufficient:
Guy lines: Even if the ballast had been sufficient, the structure still would have failed, because the synthetic webbing ratchet straps and wire rope used as guy lines would have been loaded beyond their capacity.
Structure connections: The fin plate connections attaching the guy lines to the top of the truss structure also had insufficient strength and would have failed.

The separation and billowing of the roof tarp was found not to be a cause of the collapse, because the collapse sequence had already begun before the membrane added additional forces.

Design, construction, and inspection
The report also pointed out a number of procedural factors that either contributed to the structural problems or prevented them from being discovered:
The catalog provided by the structure manufacturer, James Thomas Engineering, did not contain enough information to properly design the structure.
When the same structure was reviewed by an engineer from James Thomas Engineering in 2010, the analysis was inadequate.
There was no engineering review of the Sugarland rigging plot before it was affixed to the structure.
The installation of the structure deviated from the directions provided in the analysis by the engineer from James Thomas Engineering (in addition to the analysis being inadequate).
There was no engineering review of the structure after it was erected by Mid America Sound Corporation.
The State of Indiana governing code waived important requirements for temporary structures such as the one that collapsed.
The Indiana State Fair Commission staff did not have the appropriate information or knowledge about the structure to evaluate its use during the fair.

Preparedness, communication, and response
Several issues were found with the level of preparedness and the actions of State Fair officials and Sugarland representatives on the evening of the incident that contributed to the number of casualties:
The Indiana State Fair Commission had taken some steps to prepare for an emergency, but the overall state of preparedness was not adequate for an event the size of the Indiana State Fair.
The Indiana State Fair Commission also lacked formal protocols for delaying, postponing, or cancelling a production. As a result, it was not clear who had the authority to make decisions regarding the concert.
Weather forecasts were not properly communicated.
The response to the incident, however, was successful, with all severely injured patients being transported to hospitals within 80 minutes.

Legal cases

Several lawsuits were filed after the tragedy. In 2014, the largest lawsuit (representing multiple plaintiffs and multiple defendants) was settled for $50 million in damages. In the aforementioned lawsuit, the State of Indiana settled for paying $11 million, and the other defendants (including Live Nation and Sugarland) settled for paying the balance of the $50 million award ($39 million).  However, defendant ESG Security, Inc. (who lost one of its own in the collapse) denied liability and did not settle.  On September 14, 2015, ESG won on summary judgement and was dismissed from the case.  ESG was the only defendant dismissed from the case via the summary judgment process.

See also 
 1963 Indiana State Fair propane explosion

References 

2011 industrial disasters
Accidental deaths in Indiana
Concert disasters
Disasters in Indiana
21st century in Indianapolis
2011 in Indiana
Building collapses in 2011
2011 disasters in the United States
Building collapses in the United States
Indiana State Fair
Filmed deaths in the United States
Sara Bareilles